Oleg Anatolyevich Gubanov (born 7 June 1977) is a former Russian professional football player.

Club career
He played 4 seasons in the Russian Football National League for FC Mordovia Saransk, FC Lada Togliatti and FC Nizhny Novgorod.

References

External links
 

1977 births
Sportspeople from Volgograd
Living people
Russian footballers
Association football midfielders
FC Tekstilshchik Kamyshin players
FC Energiya Volzhsky players
FC Lada-Tolyatti players
FC Nizhny Novgorod (2007) players
FC Mordovia Saransk players
FC Rotor Volgograd players
FC Volga Ulyanovsk players